Mabel is a feminine given name.

Mabel or Maybelle may also refer to:

Places

United States
Mabel, Florida, an unincorporated community
Mabel, Kentucky, an unincorporated community
Mabel, Minnesota, a small city
Mabel, Missouri, an unincorporated community
Mabel, Oregon, an unincorporated community

Elsewhere
Cape Mabel, Laurie Island, Antarctica
Mabel Island, Queensland, Australia
Mabel Lake, British Columbia, Canada

People
Bessilyn Johnson (1872–1943), author used the pen name "Mabel"
Mabel (singer) (born 1996), Spanish-born English R&B and pop singer 
 Mabel The Hick, a female wrestler from Gorgeous Ladies of Wrestling
Mabel Johnson Leland (1871-1947), American lecturer, translator 
Mabel Matiz (born 1985), Turkish pop music singer-songwriter
Maybelle Carter (1909–1978), American country musician 
Viscera (wrestler) (1971–2014), professional wrestler who used ring name "Mabel"

Fictional characters 
Mabel Pines, One of the main characters from the Disney Television Animation show Gravity Falls
Mabel the Ugly Stepsister, a character from the Shrek film series
Mama Maybelle Harper, a character in the American TV sitcom Gimme a Break!

Other uses
"Mabel" (Better Call Saul), episode of the television series Better Call Saul
Mabel (band), Danish popular music group
Mabel (dog), dog on Blue Peter
Mabel (group), an Italo dance project
MABEL (robot), a robot engineered in 2009 at the University of Michigan, United States

See also
 Mabel Downs, a cattle station in Western Australia
Mable (disambiguation)
Maple or Acer, a genus of trees
Miss Mabel, a 1948 stage play by R. C. Sherriff
"Mistress Mabel", a song by the Fratellis from the 2008 album Here We Stand